The Golden Butterfly Awards (Turkish: Altın Kelebek Ödülleri) are annual Turkish music and television awards held since 1972 and sponsored by Pantene. Recipients are chosen by readers of the daily newspaper Hürriyet, and the event is broadcast live on the television channel Kanal D. Since 2017, the ceremony has included the Azerbaijan's Brightest Star award, to celebrate that country's highest achievements in the music and television industries.

Award categories

Television
 Best Series
 Best Actress
 Best Actor
 Best Comedy Series
 Best Actress in a Comedy
 Best Actor in a Comedy
 Best Director
 Best Screenwriter
 Best Series Music
 Best Child Actor
 Best Competition Program
 Best Talk Show
 Best Sports Program
 Best Magazine Program
 Best Culture and Art Program
 Best Daytime Program
 Best TV Series Couple
 Best Female Host
 Best Male Host
 Best Female News Presenter
 Best Male News Presenter
 Best News Program

Music
 Best Song of the Year
 Best Turkish Pop Female Artist
 Best Turkish Pop Male Artist
 Best Turkish Rap Female Artist
 Best Turkish Rap Male Artist
 Best Turkish Folk Female Artist
 Best Turkish Folk Male Artist
 Best Turkish Rock Female Artist
 Best Turkish Rock Male Artist
 Best Turkish Classical Female Artist
 Best Turkish Classical Male Artist
 Best Fantezi Music Female Artist
 Best Fantezi Music Male Artist
 Best Breakthrough Artist
 Best Group
 Best Breakthrough Group
 Best Music Video
 Best Rap Group

Digital Media
 Best Internet Series
 Best Digital Content
 Best YouTuber
 Best Twitch Streamer
 Best Influencer

Special awards
 TV Stars Special
 Azerbaijan's Brightest Star

References

External links
 

Golden Butterfly Awards
Awards established in 1972
1972 establishments in Turkey
Turkish television awards
Turkish music awards
Mass media in Turkey